Matterdale is a civil parish in the Lake District of Cumbria, England.  It lies on the northern shore of Ullswater.  The parish includes the settlements of Dockray,  Matterdale End, Ulcat row, Watermillock and Wreay.  It had a population of 526 in 2001, reducing to 483 at the 2011 Census.

Much of the parish consists of moorland and fells, including Hart Side, Gowbarrow Fell and Little Mell Fell.  The "Three Dodds" (Stybarrow Dodd, Watson's Dodd and Great Dodd) lie on the western boundary of the parish.  The western part of the parish is drained by Aira Beck, which falls over Aira Force to enter Ullswater.  The parish is the setting for James Rebank's 2015 autobiographical book The Shepherd's Life.

Etymology
Matterdale "is probably 'the valley where bedstraw grows' from ON 'maðra' (the cognate of OE 'mæddre') and ON 'dalr'..." (ON=Old Norse; OE=Old English).

See also

Listed buildings in Matterdale

References

External links
  Cumbria County History Trust: Matterdale (nb: provisional research only - see Talk page)
Matterdale Community Association (local community online resource)

Civil parishes in Cumbria
Eden District